Atherinoidei is a suborder of the order Atheriniformes comprising six families, with a mainly Old World distribution, although a few species are found in the western Atlantic Ocean.

Families
The suborder contains the following families:

 Family Isonidae Rosen, 1964 (surf sardines)
 Family Melanotaeniidae Gill, 1894 Rainbowfishes and blue-eyes
 Subfamily Bedotiinae Jordan & Hubbs, 1919 Madagascar rainbowfishes
 Subfamily Melanotaeniinae Gill, 1894 Rainbowfishes
 Subfamily Pseudomugilinae Kner, 1867 Blue-eyes
 Subfamily Telmatherininae Munro, 1958 Celebes rainbowfishes
 Family Atherionidae Schultz, 1948 Pricklenose silversides
 Family Dentatherinidae Patten & Ivantsoff 1983 Mercer’s tusked silverside
 Family Phallostethidae Regan 1916 priapiumfishes
 Subfamily Phallostethinae Regan, 1916
 Subfamily Gulaphallinae Herre, 1925
 Family Atherinidae Risso, 1827 Old World silversides
 Subfamily Atherinomorinae Dyer & Chernoff, 1996
 Subfamily Craterocephalinae Dyer & Chernoff, 1966 Hardheads
 Subfamily Bleheratherinae Aarn & Ivantsoff, 2009
 Subfmaily Atherininae Risso, 1827

References

Atheriniformes